Alucita anemolia is a moth of the family Alucitidae. It is found in India (Madras).

References

Moths described in 1929
Alucitidae
Moths of Asia
Taxa named by Edward Meyrick